"Song Instead of a Kiss" is a song by Canadian singer-songwriter Alannah Myles, released as the first single from her second album, Rockinghorse (1992). The power ballad became her first and only number-one single in Canada, topping the RPM Top Singles chart for four weeks and ending 1992 as Canada's third-most-successful single. It also became a top-20 hit in Finland but charted weakly in other countries.

Background
The song was co-written by Myles, songwriting partner Nancy Simmonds, and noted Canadian poet Robert Priest. The song's lyrics were a poem by Priest that he had sent to Simmonds, a friend of his and through whom he had met Myles. Simmonds and Myles were in Barbados writing Myles' second album, and after days struggling to write, Simmonds showed Myles the poem and, liking it, she immediately sang the melody over it, which Simmonds duly noted with her guitar. Myles had just finished a romantic relationship with Robert Plant and felt the lyrics expressed her feelings and pain about the split.

Atlantic Records were not pleased with the demo they presented them, but Myles and her producer David Tyson decided to carry on working on it nonetheless. Tyson arranged the song, including the notable minute-and-a-half intro of the song (which was edited out on the single edit), after which Myles cut the final vocals. When they presented the reworked track to Atlantic, they loved it, and, unbeknownst to Myles, sent it to Plant to see if he could duet with her on the song, a move she was furious about. Myles has cited that it is one of her favourite songs from her catalogue.

Release and reception
The song was chosen as the lead single from the Rockinghorse album. While Myles liked the song and found it single-worthy, she was adamant about releasing the uptempo rocker "Our World, Our Times" instead of a ballad as the first single, but was overruled by the record company because they feared the political lyrics of that song would hurt its airplay and chart performance.

The song performed successfully in Myles's native Canada, becoming her first and only number-one hit on the RPM Top Singles, staying four weeks at number one in November and December 1992. It also topped the RPM Adult Contemporary charts for one week in November 1992, her second number one on that chart after "Lover of Mine" in 1990. In the United States, the record was ignored and did not get much airplay, and it was not released as a commercial single. In Europe and Australia, the record received airplay but was not a substantial hit, achieving minor chart placings in these regions; however, in Finland, it reached the top 20, peaking at number 13 in October 1992 and remaining in the top 30 for three charting periods (six weeks).

Larry Flick from Billboard described it as a "slow-building power ballad." He added that Myles "offers a strikingly restrained and unaffected vocal, while dramatic synths and acoustic guitars rise and swirl around her. Bodes well for the forthcoming "Rockinghorse" album." Randy Clark from Cashbox called it "another dark and brooding ballad", adding that "this cut is slightly off the rocker without the thumping bass line that pumped her first hit to the top of the charts, this time opting for an acoustically orchestrated backing."

Music video
The stylish music video was directed by Paul Boyd and filmed at Capitol Studios in Hollywood. In it, Myles is seen wearing different veils and shots of her lying in a bed while singing the song, with emphasis on close-ups on her face and her eyes. The setting of the video looks like a padded cell, although it is not explicitly explained.

Awards and accolades
In 1993, the song was nominated for two Juno Awards, for Single of the Year, losing to the Celine Dion and Peabo Bryson duet "Beauty and the Beast", and for Best Producer to David Tyson. The song also received a SOCAN award in Canada, in 1994.

Track listings

Canadian cassette single and European 7-inch single
 "Song Instead of a Kiss" – 3:57
 "Rockinghorse" – 3:00

US promo CD
 "Song Instead of a Kiss" (edit) – 4:05

UK CD single and 12-inch maxi-single
 "Song Instead of a Kiss" (edit) – 4:05
 "Rockinghorse" – 3:00
 "Love Is" – 3:39
 "Song Instead of a Kiss" (LP version) – 5:03

Charts

Weekly charts

Year-end charts

References

1990s ballads
1992 singles
1992 songs
Alannah Myles songs
Atlantic Records singles
Music videos directed by Paul Boyd
Songs about music
Rock ballads
RPM Top Singles number-one singles